Yolande of Dreux (1212–1248) was Duchess of Burgundy as the first wife of Hugh IV of Burgundy (duke of Burgundy between 1218 and 1271). 

She was the daughter of Count Robert III "Gasteblé" of Dreux and of Braine, and his wife Alianor de St. Valéry.

Issue
Yolande's children with Hugh IV of Burgundy included:
 Margaret, Lady of Molinot (1229–1277), who married 1st(after 1239) William III (d. 1256), lord of Mont St Jean and 2nd Guy VI (d. 1263), viscount of Limoges
 Odo, count of Nevers and Auxerre (1230–1266)
 John (1231–1268), who married Agnes and had Beatrice of Burgundy, heiress of Bourbon
 Alice (1233–1273), who married Henry III, Duke of Brabant
 Robert II, Duke of Burgundy (1248–1306)

References

1212 births
1248 deaths
Duchesses of Burgundy
House of Dreux
13th-century French people
13th-century French women

Deaths_in_childbirth